Penny Barg and Beth Herr were the defending champions but only Herr competed that year with Terry Phelps.

Herr and Phelps lost in the final 6–7, 7–6, 7–6 against Elise Burgin and Rosalyn Fairbank.

Seeds
Champion seeds are indicated in bold text while text in italics indicates the round in which those seeds were eliminated.

 Elise Burgin /  Rosalyn Fairbank (champions)
 Lise Gregory /  Dianne Van Rensburg (first round)
 Jenny Byrne /  Janine Tremelling (quarterfinals)
 Patty Fendick /  Anne Smith (semifinals)

Draw

References
 1988 Virginia Slims of Arizona Doubles Draw

Virginia Slims of Arizona
1988 WTA Tour